Marie-Josée Croze (born February 23, 1970) is a Canadian actress. She also holds French citizenship, which she obtained in December 2012.

Early life
Croze was born in Montreal, Quebec, was adopted, and grew up in Longueuil with four other children. She studied fine arts at the Cégep du Vieux Montréal from 1986 to 1987.

Career 

She received the award for Best Performance by an Actress in a Leading Role at the 21st Genie Awards for her role in Denis Villeneuve's Maelström (2000).

She won the Best Actress award at the 2003 Cannes Film Festival for her performance in The Barbarian Invasions. She was cast by  director Steven Spielberg in his film Munich, released in December 2005. She also appeared as a speech therapist in Julian Schnabel's 2007 film adaptation of Jean-Dominique Bauby's memoir The Diving Bell and the Butterfly.

In November 2012, she was selected as a member of the main competition jury at the 2012 International Film Festival of Marrakech.

Selected filmography

Film

 La postière (1992): Fille du bordel
 La Florida (1993): Carmen
 HLA identique (1998): Marie
 Maelström (2000): Bibiane Champagne
 Ascension (2002): Pregnant Woman (lead)
 Ararat (2002): Celia
 Des chiens dans la neige (2002): Lucie
 Battlefield Earth: A Saga of the Year 3000 (2002): Mara
 Nothing (2003): Sara
 The Barbarian Invasions (2003): Nathalie
 Mensonges et trahisons et plus si affinités... (2004): Muriel
 Ordo (2004): Louise Sandoli
 Taking Lives (2004): Medical Examiner
 Munich (2005): Jeanette the Dutch Assassin
 The Girl from the Chartreuse (original title: La petite chartreuse) (2005): Pascale Blanchot
 Ne le dis à personne (Tell No One) (2006): Margot Beck
 La mémoire des autres (2006): Constance
 Les oiseaux du ciel (2006): Tango
 Le scaphandre et le papillon (The Diving Bell and the Butterfly) (2007): Henriette Roi
 Jacquou le Croquant (2007): La mère de Jacquou
 Deux jours à tuer (2008): Cécile
 Le nouveau protocole (2008): (post-production)
 Vivre! (2009)
 Je l'aimais (2009): Mathilde
 Un balcon sur la mer (2009)
 Hidden Diary (2009): Louise
 Liberté (2009): Mlle Lundi
 Murder on the Orient Express TV (2010): Greta Ohlsson
 Another Silence (2011)
 La Certosa di Parma (2012)
 Collision (2013)
 Calvary (2014)
 An Eye for Beauty (2014)
 Every Thing Will Be Fine (2015)
 2 Nights Till Morning (2015): Caroline
 Au nom de ma fille (2016)
 The Confessions (2016)
 Iqaluit (2016)
 MILF (2018): Sonia
 Disappearance at Clifton Hill (2019): Mrs. Moulin
 The Forgiven (2021): Isabelle

Television

 Chambres en ville (1989) - Noémie Vanasse
 Le choix (1991, TV Movie) 
 Montréal P.Q. (1992) 
 Zelda (1993, TV Movie) - Nanny
 The Hunger (1997) - Woman / Mimi
 Le masque (1997) - Nadine Mallette
 Captive (1998, TV Movie) - Juliette Laurier
 Murder Most Likely (1999) - Marie Cartier
 Largo Winch (2003)
 Birdsong (2012) - Jeanne
 Jack Ryan (2018) - Sandrine Arnaud

References

External links

 
 Canadian Film Encyclopedia, (TIFF, ca 2004)

1970 births
Actresses from Montreal
Canadian film actresses
Canadian television actresses
French Quebecers
Best Actress Genie and Canadian Screen Award winners
Best Supporting Actress Genie and Canadian Screen Award winners
Cannes Film Festival Award for Best Actress winners
Living people
20th-century Canadian actresses
21st-century Canadian actresses
Best Actress Jutra and Iris Award winners